Moosomin was a territorial electoral district in Northwest Territories, Canada that came into existence by Royal Proclamation in 1885 and was abolished when Alberta and Saskatchewan were created in 1905.

History
The electoral district was mandated to return a single member to the Legislative Assembly of the Northwest Territories. The electoral district was named after the town of Moosomin, Northwest Territories and the town's name sake Chief Moosomin, a well known leader of the Cree in the late 19th century.

Members of the Legislative Assembly (MLAs)

Election results

1885 election

1888 election

1891 election

1894 election

1898 election

1902 election

References

External links 
Website of the Legislative Assembly of Northwest Territories

Former electoral districts of Northwest Territories